Caudill's Army was the name of a Confederate force from South Eastern Kentucky during the American Civil War
that included the 10th Kentucky Mounted Rifles (designated the 13th Kentucky Cavalry in March 1865) commanded by Colonel Benjamin E. Caudill. An element of the Army of Tennessee and which served at times under General John Hunt Morgan's command.  The force was active in the battle of Leatherwood and the Battle of Marion.

See also
 List of Kentucky Civil War Confederate units

Sources
The battle of Leatherwood
The battle of Marion

Units and formations of the Confederate States Army from Kentucky